Section 6 of the Constitution of Australia makes mandatory at least one sitting of the Parliament of Australia within a calendar year of its previous sitting.

References

External links
 Commonwealth Of Australia Constitution Act - Sect 6 at Austlii

Australian constitutional law